Gamaliel   is an unincorporated community and census-designated place (CDP) in Baxter County, Arkansas, United States. Gamaliel has a post office with ZIP code 72537.

Gamaliel is located on a ridge between Bennetts Bayou to the east and the Norfork River/Norfork Lake to the west. Gamaliel campground on the east arm of Norfork Lake is about three miles to the southeast.

It was first listed as a CDP in the 2020 census with a population of 33.

Demographics

2020 census

Note: the US Census treats Hispanic/Latino as an ethnic category. This table excludes Latinos from the racial categories and assigns them to a separate category. Hispanics/Latinos can be of any race.

References

Census-designated places in Baxter County, Arkansas
Census-designated places in Arkansas
Unincorporated communities in Baxter County, Arkansas
Unincorporated communities in Arkansas